Carl Ernst Funke (January 20, 1835 – January 29, 1906) was an American businessman and politician.

Funke was born in Lützen, Germany. He emigrated to the United States in 1853 and settled in Oconto, Wisconsin. Funke was in the rope manufacturing business. Funke served on the Oconto Village Board and then served as mayor of Oconto. He also served on the Oconto County Board of Supervisors. Funke served in the Wisconsin Assembly in 1878 and 1881 and was a Republican. He also served as postmaster for Oconto, Wisconsin. Funke was also in the hardware and hotel business in Oconto.

Notes

External links

1835 births
1906 deaths
People from Oconto, Wisconsin
People from Lützen
German emigrants to the United States
Businesspeople from Wisconsin
Wisconsin city council members
County supervisors in Wisconsin
Mayors of places in Wisconsin
American hoteliers
19th-century American politicians
19th-century American businesspeople
Wisconsin postmasters
Republican Party members of the Wisconsin State Assembly